Jagdish Mitra Pahwa (1922-2001) was an Indian ophthalmologist, social worker and a specialist in Retinal Detachment and Photocoagulation who was reported to have conducted several charitable eye camps in India. Born on 4 July 1922 in Multan in the erstwhile British India (now in Pakistan), he graduated in medicine from the King Edward Medical University, Lahore. He was a 1969 elected fellow of the National Academy of Medical Sciences and a recipient of the NAB Rustom Merwanji Alpaiwalla Memorial Award from the National Association for the Blind (India) in 1944. The Government of India awarded him the fourth highest Indian civilian award of Padma Shri in 1973.

References

1922 births
2001 deaths
People from Multan
Indian ophthalmologists
Social workers
20th-century Indian medical doctors
King Edward Medical University alumni
Recipients of the Padma Shri in medicine
20th-century surgeons